Bernhard Raimann (born September 23, 1997) is an Austrian gridiron football offensive tackle for the Indianapolis Colts of the National Football League (NFL). He played college football at Central Michigan.

Early life
Raimann grew up in Steinbrunn, Austria. He began playing American football at the age of 14 for the Vienna Vikings' youth team. Raimann attended Ballsportgymnasium in Vienna and attended Delton-Kellogg High School in Delton, Michigan as an exchange student for his junior year. While on exchange, he lived with a host family that included a former Central Michigan football player, Rollie Ferris, and his future college teammate, Tyden Ferris. He returned to Austria after the year and completed his compulsory service in the Austrian military after graduating from Ballsportgymnasium Wien. Raimann committed to play college football at Central Michigan after his military service was completed.

College career
Raimann played tight end during his first two seasons at Central Michigan. He caught 20 passes for 164 yards over the course of his first two seasons. He was moved to the offensive tackle position after his sophomore year and started all six of the Chippewas' games during its COVID-19-shortened 2020 season. In 2021, Pro Football Focus named Raimann their Offensive Player of the Year for the Mid-American Conference.

Professional career 

Raimann was drafted in the third round (77th overall) of the 2022 NFL Draft by the Indianapolis Colts. His selection was the result of a surprising draft-day slide, considering that most experts projected that he would be gone within the first 20 picks of the draft.

References

Further reading

 Andrew Moore, "Bernhard Raimann: Indianapolis Colts Rookie Files." Horseshoe Huddle, Sept. 1, 2022.

External links
 Indianapolis Colts bio
 Central Michigan Chippewas bio

1997 births
Living people
American football offensive tackles
Central Michigan Chippewas football players
People from Eisenstadt-Umgebung District
Austrian players of American football
Indianapolis Colts players
Sportspeople from Burgenland